Smith Farm, also known as the Smith-Grundy Farm, is a historic home and farm located in Washington Township, Hendricks County, Indiana.  The farmhouse was built in 1928, and is a two-story, Tudor Revival style frame dwelling with a brick veneer. It has a steeply pitched side gable roof and projecting front gabled pavilion. Also on the property are the contributing English barn, butcher shop, corn crib, and cattle barn, all dated to the mid-1920s.

It was added to the National Register of Historic Places in 2007.

References

Farms on the National Register of Historic Places in Indiana
Tudor Revival architecture in Indiana
Houses completed in 1928
National Register of Historic Places in Hendricks County, Indiana
Buildings and structures in Hendricks County, Indiana